Dermot Hurlston Payton (born 19 February 1945) is a former New Zealand first-class cricketer who played for Central Districts from 1965 to 1977.

An opening batsman, Payton made his highest score of 145 against Otago in 1974–75. He also represented Wairarapa in Hawke Cup cricket between 1963 and 1988, captaining the team when they held the title between February 1977 and February 1979.

He has coached cricketers for many years, including some years as coach of Central Districts. In 2009 he was awarded an International Cricket Council centenary medal for services to cricket. He is the Patron, and a life member, of the Wairarapa Cricket Association. He has a farm near Masterton.

References

External links
 

1945 births
Living people
New Zealand cricketers
Central Districts cricketers
People from Carterton, New Zealand
New Zealand cricket coaches